Z. terrestris may refer to:
 Zizania terrestris, a wild rice species
 Zoothera terrestris, an extinct bird species

See also
 Terrestris